The FIS Cross-Country Alpen Cup, OPA Alpen Cup (alpine nations ski association) or simply Alpen Cup is one of the nine FIS Cross-Country Continental Cups, a series of second-level cross-country skiing competitions ranked below the Cross-Country World Cup. It is arranged by the International Ski Federation (FIS) and the ski associations of the alpine countries.

History 
After the Alpen Cup had been held as a junior series for several years, the 2004 FIS Congress in Miami incorporated Alpen Cup as an official continental cup, ranked as a second-level competition ranked below the Cross-Country World Cup. Even today there is still a Youth Alpen Cup, which is held under the name Under-18 according to the same rules as the senior's Alpen Cup. Cross-country skiers from all member associations affiliated to the International Ski Federation can take part in Alpen Cup, but only athletes from OPA members can collect points according to the FIS points system. These member associations are Andorra, Austria, Czech Republic, France, Germany, Italy, Liechtenstein, Slovenia, Spain and Switzerland. At the end of each season, the overall winner will be determined from the points awarded, which will then get a personal starting place in the beginning of the following World Cup season.

In contrast to World Cup ratings, the three worst results can be removed out of the overall ranking, but only if more than twelve competitions are held in the relevant season. In the competitions themselves, there is also a U-20 rating for women and men in addition to the senior's competition. In addition to the overall ranking, winners are also determined in the sprint and distance rankings. The best nation is also honoured. The overall winners receive trophies and prize money. 

Similar to the Tour de Ski in the World Cup, two mini-tours over three stages each are being held as part of the Alpen Cup. The top 30 athletes on the mini-tour will be awarded double points for the overall standings. In addition, the European Cross-Country Skiing Championship has been held annually as a U-18 competition of the European Ski Federation (ESF) as part of the Alpen Cup since 2011.

World Cup qualification
In the end of certain periods, the overall leaders for both genders receive a place in the World Cup in the following period. The overall winners of the season receive a place in the World Cup in the beginning of the following season.

Overall winners

Men

Women

References

External links
 Rules of the Organisation der Alpenländer-Skiverbände 2014/15 (in German)
 Overview over Alpencup history at Weltcup-B.org (in German)

FIS Cross-Country Continental Cup
Recurring sporting events established in 2004